The  Hundred of Vincent, South Australia is a hundred of the County of Buccleuch. west of Lake Alexandrina. The Hundred was founded in 1898, and is located at -34.973079681n and 139.844161987e, and the principal town of the hundred is Perponda, South Australia.

References

Vincent